Orville Forest Weaver (June 4, 1886 – November 28, 1970) was a professional baseball player who played pitcher in the Major Leagues from – for the Chicago Cubs and Boston Rustlers. He was born in Newport, Tennessee, on June 4, 1887. He died in New Orleans, Louisiana on November 28, 1970.

References

External links

1886 births
1970 deaths
Major League Baseball pitchers
Chicago Cubs players
Boston Rustlers players
Baseball players from Kentucky
People from Newport, Kentucky
Jacksonville Jays players
Louisville Colonels (minor league) players
Maryville Scots baseball players
New Orleans Pelicans (baseball) players
Atlanta Crackers players
Milwaukee Brewers (minor league) players
Chattanooga Lookouts players
Wichita Falls Spudders players
People from Newport, Tennessee